John Van Horlick (born February 19, 1949) is a Canadian former professional ice hockey defenceman. He played two games in World Hockey Association for the Toronto Toros during the 1975–76 season, registering zero points and twelve penalty minutes. He later served as head coach for the New Westminster Bruins during the 1987–88 season.

References

1949 births
Living people
Beauce Jaros players
Canadian ice hockey defencemen
Canadian people of Dutch descent
Charlotte Checkers (EHL) players
New Westminster Bruins coaches
Omaha Knights (CHL) players
Portland Buckaroos players
Salt Lake Golden Eagles (CHL) players
Springfield Kings players
Ice hockey people from Vancouver
Toronto Toros players
Canadian ice hockey coaches